The 2017 League 1 Cup known as the 2017 iPro Sport cup for sponsorship reasons is the third running of the competition, first played in 2015.

The 2017 competition was won by Barrow Raiders who defeated North Wales Crusaders 38–32 in the final at Bloomfield Road, Blackpool on 27 May 2017.

The League 1 Cup competition is for the rugby league clubs in the British League 1 - the third tier of rugby league in Britain.  There are 16 teams in League 1 but Canadian club Toronto Wolfpack declined to enter the tournament. As a result, amateur team and 2016 Conference Challenge Trophy winners Rochdale Mayfield were invited into the competition to bring the numbers to 16.

Teams

First round
The first round draw of the 2016 iPro Sport Cup was broadcast live on BBC Radio Leeds on 20 December 2016 from 6.45pm. For the first round the teams were split into two pools – Pool A (Northern regions) and Pool B (Midlands and Southern regions).  Ties to be played over the weekend of 18–19 February 2017.

The draw was made by former Keighley player Paul Handforth (man of the match in 2016 final) and BBC Leeds presenter and former footballer Paul Ogden.

Pool A

Pool B

Quarter finals
The draw was made immediately after the conclusion of the first round matches.

Semi finals
The draw for the semi finals was made on 3 April 2017.  Making the draw were England assistant coach Paul Anderson and BBC rugby league correspondent Dave Woods.

Final
The final between Barrow Raiders and North Wales Crusaders was played on 27 May at Bloomfield Road, Blackpool as the curtain raiser to the 2017 Summer Bash.

References

RFL League 1
2017 in English rugby league
2017 in Welsh rugby league